Akeman Street may refer to one of two Roman roads in southern England:

 Akeman Street – from Cirencester (Gloucestershire) to St Albans (Hertfordshire)
 Akeman Street railway station – a former railway station at Woodham (Buckinghamshire)
 RAF Akeman Street – a former airfield near Minster Lovell (Oxfordshire)
 Akeman Street (Cambridgeshire) – from Wimpole Hall (Cambridgeshire) to Brancaster (Norfolk)

See also
 MS Norman Atlantic – a former passenger ferry (built in 2009 and scrapped in 2019), originally called MS Akeman Street